Hang Hau is an MTR station of , located at Pui Shing Road, Hang Hau, Tseung Kwan O, in the New Territories of Hong Kong. It was the easternmost station in the MTR railway system, until LOHAS Park station opened on 26 July 2009. It was named after Hang Hau Village, which is about a 10-minute walk from the station. Residence Oasis, a private residential estate, and its accompanied shopping centre, the Lane, are situated above the station.

History
The HK$1.3-billion contract to construct the station was awarded to Dragages et Travaux Publics, the Hong Kong subsidiary of Bouygues, in 1999.

The station opened on 18 August 2002.

Station layout

Entrances/exits 
There are two exits, A and B, at two ends of the station. Each exit is divided into two adjacent sub-exits.
A1: Residence Oasis 
A2: On Ning Garden 
B1: The Lane 
B2: Tseung Kwan O Sports Ground

Notes

References 

MTR stations in the New Territories
Tseung Kwan O line
Hang Hau
Railway stations in Hong Kong opened in 2002
Extra areas operated by NT taxis